Patrick James O'Donnell (25 November 1876 – 10 October 1915) was an  Australian rules footballer who played with Geelong in the Victorian Football League (VFL). He died from pneumonia aged 38.

Notes

External links 

1876 births
1915 deaths
Australian rules footballers from Victoria (Australia)
Geelong Football Club players
Deaths from pneumonia in Victoria (Australia)